John Wallace Riddle Jr. (July 12, 1864 – December 8, 1941) was an American diplomat.  His first diplomatic assignment was as agent/consul general in Egypt (1904–1905). He was then sent to Romania and Serbia in 1905 to serve as Envoy Extraordinary and Minister Plenipotentiary (residing in Bucharest), followed by postings as U.S. ambassador to Russia (1907–1909) and ambassador to Argentina (1922–1925).

Personal life
Born in Philadelphia, Riddle was the son of John Wallace Riddle, Sr. and Rebecca Blair McClure; he was born after his father's untimely death.  A few years later, Rebecca McClure became the second wife of Charles Eugene Flandrau and relocated to St. Paul, Minnesota where Riddle grew up alongside two half-brothers and two step-sisters.  He graduated from Harvard in 1887, attended law school at Columbia through 1890, and studied international law, diplomacy, and languages at École Libre des Sciences Politiques and the Collège de France in Paris through 1893.

In 1916 Riddle married American architect and heiress Theodate Pope Riddle.

He died in Farmington, Connecticut, at the age of 77.

References

1864 births
1941 deaths
Ambassadors of the United States to Argentina
Ambassadors of the United States to Egypt
Ambassadors of the United States to Romania
Ambassadors of the United States to Russia
Harvard University alumni
Columbia Law School alumni
Ambassadors of the United States to Serbia
United States Foreign Service personnel
20th-century American diplomats